Najib Ullah (February 14, 1914 to August 2, 1965) was an Afghan writer and ambassador.

Ullah worked for the Foreign Office of Afghanistan for many years. He was also an ambassador to India, ambassador to England and ambassador to the United States.  He served as the Head of the Afghan delegation at UNESCO General Assembly in Beirut, Lebanon, in 1948.
If he is not confused with Mohammad Najibullah, the name can be contracted.
 May 9, 1946: Najibulla Torwayana was appointed minister of Education
 From 1954 to 1958 Sardar Najibullah was ambassador to India.
 From 1956 to 1958 was Dr. Najibullah Torwayana ambassador to the United States of America.
 1957	Majibullah Turwayna was Ambassador to the Court of St James’s.

Bibliography
Political History of Afghanistan, 1942–1944
Strabo and Aryana, 1945
Negotiations With Pakistan, 1948
Islamic Literature, 1963

References

1914 births
1965 deaths
Ambassadors of Afghanistan to India
Ambassadors of Afghanistan to the United States
Ambassadors of Afghanistan to the United Kingdom